National Highway 310, commonly referred to as NH 310 is a national highway in  India. It is a spur road of National Highway 10. NH-310 traverses the state of Sikkim in India.

Route 
Ranipaul, Burduk, Menla, Changgu, Sherathang, Nathu La.

Junctions  

  Terminal near Ranipaul.
  near Menla.
  Terminal at Nathu La India/China border.

See also 

 List of National Highways in India by highway number
 List of National Highways in India by state

References

External links 

 NH 310 on OpenStreetMap

National highways in India
National Highways in Sikkim